Karpinskiosaurus is an extinct genus of seymouriamorphs. It includes two species: Karpinskiosaurus secundus and Karpinskiosaurus ultimus. Karpinskiosaurus secundus is represented by two specimens with skull lengths of about 75 mm. All specimens of K. ultimus are smaller than those of K. secundus. Total length of the reptiliomorph was about 50–75 cm.

References

Seymouriamorphs
Permian tetrapods of Asia
Basal tetrapods of Europe